La Latina is a station of Line 5 of the Madrid Metro. It is located in the Barrio de La Latina, part of the district Centro, in fare Zone A.

Overview
Located near Plaza de la Cebada, a central square of Madrid, La Latina was opened the 6 June 1968, when the Line 5 was inaugurated from Callao to Carabanchel.

It is an underground station at 28 m below ground with 2 tracks and 2 platforms. It counts 3 entrances: San Francisco (Calle de Toledo, 56), San Millán (C. Toledo, 65) and Toledo (C. Toledo, 62).

References

Line 5 (Madrid Metro) stations
Railway stations in Spain opened in 1968